Small Minds is a studio album by Austin-based bluegrass band Austin Lounge Lizards. It continues the Lizards' tradition of social and political satire.

Critical reception
The Austin Chronicle called the opening track a "drunk, horn-seasoned version of Emily Kaitz's Kerrville fave 'Shallow End of the Gene Pool.'"

AllMusic called Small Minds "a finely played and sung album that's a pleasure to listen to and gets a definite recommendation." "Gingrich the Newt" postulates politician Newt Gingrich has given "the humble newt species a bad name) to the intelligentsia of the art world." The song begins: "We'd like to set the record straight by singing of the newt." It then implies Gingrich has none of these values. Instead, "Gingrich the Newt is puffed up like a toad / So full of himself that he's bound to explode."

Track listing

Personnel
 Richard Bowden: fiddle, trumpet, Perot, livestock, violin vocals
 Hank Card: rhythm guitar, vocals
 Conrad Deisler: acoustic and electric guitars, mandolin, Blevins, livestock, vocals
 Tom Pittman: steel guitar, banjo, vocals
 Kirk Williams: bass, livestock, vocals

Additional Personnel
 Ray Benson: vocals, lead Blevins (on 3)
 John Mills: tenor and baritone saxophone
 Paul Pearcy: drums, percussion, marching snare, bongos
 Boo Resnick: vocals, Blevins (on 3)

References

1995 albums